Yojimbo is a personal information manager for MacOS by Bare Bones Software. It can store notes, images and media, URLs, web pages, and passwords. Yojimbo can also encrypt any of its contents and store the password in the Keychain. It is Bare Bones' second Cocoa application.

History

Yojimbo was first released on January 23, 2006. At the time, Bare Bones called it "a completely new information organizer".

 Yojimbo 1.1
 Yojimbo 1.3
 Yojimbo 1.5
 Yojimbo 2.0
 Yojimbo 2.1
 Yojimbo 2.2
 Yojimbo 3 and new iPad version
 Yojimbo 4
 Yojimbo 4.5

In 2007, another developer, Adrian Ross, created Webjimbo, a web interface through which users can access their Yojimbo libraries.

Like other developers, Bare Bones Software faced difficulties adding iCloud sync due to early limitations in Apple's service. Tech reporter Christophe Laporte criticized Yojimbo's transition to iCloud as bungled, and expressed frustration at the lack of updates to the app.

References

External links
 Yojimbo homepage

Password managers
MacOS-only software
Personal information managers
Products introduced in 2006